Kevin Bickner (born 23 September 1996) is an American ski jumper. He is the current national record holder, with  set in Vikersund on 19 March 2017.

Career 

In the 2014/15 season, Bickner made his World Cup debut but did not qualify to the main event in Lahti. He scored first World Cup points in the 2016/17 season and finished at 23rd place in Klingenthal.

In 2017, Bickner performed at his first Nordic World Championships in Lahti and finished 30th place at large hill individual, 47th place at normal hill individual, 8th place at mixed normal hill and 11th place at team large hill.

In 2018, he participated in his first Winter Olympics in Pyeongchang and finished 18th place at normal hill individual, 20th place at large hill individual, and 9th place at team large hill.

World Cup

Standings

Individual starts (68)

References

External links 

1996 births
Living people
American male ski jumpers
Olympic ski jumpers of the United States
Ski jumpers at the 2018 Winter Olympics
Ski jumpers at the 2022 Winter Olympics
Sportspeople from Chicago